Vypalai (formerly) is a village in Kėdainiai district municipality, in Kaunas County, in central Lithuania. According to the 2011 census, the village was uninhabited. It is located 2.5 km from Miegėnai.

There was Wypały estate in Skėmiai volost at the 19th century.

Demography

References

Villages in Kaunas County
Kėdainiai District Municipality